The Pike River is a river of Minnesota, United States.  The river was named on account of its stock of pike fish.

See also
List of rivers of Minnesota

References

Minnesota Watersheds
USGS Hydrologic Unit Map - State of Minnesota (1974)

Rivers of St. Louis County, Minnesota
Rivers of Minnesota